The Itajaí-Açu River is a river in the state of Santa Catarina in southeastern Brazil. It flows into the Atlantic Ocean near the city Itajaí.

The river basin includes part of the  Canela Preta Biological Reserve, a full protected area.

See also
List of rivers of Santa Catarina

References

 Map from Ministry of Transport

Rivers of Santa Catarina (state)